Åsa Elisabeth Svedmark (born 11 June 1961 in Vilhelmina) is a Swedish former alpine skier who competed in the 1980 Winter Olympics.

External links
 sports-reference.com
 

1961 births
Swedish female alpine skiers
Alpine skiers at the 1980 Winter Olympics
Olympic alpine skiers of Sweden
People from Vilhelmina Municipality
Living people
Sportspeople from Västerbotten County
20th-century Swedish women